Rowe v Vale of White Horse DC [2003] EWHC 388 (Admin) is an English unjust enrichment law case, concerning the nature of an enrichment.

Facts
Mr Rowe did not get charged for sewerage from 1982 to 1995 because of administrative error and till 2001 because the Vale of White Horse District Council was unsure whether it had legal power to operate the local sewerage station. In 2001 the District Council found it did have the power, and in March it wrote demanding payment since 1995. Mr Rowe said he had no idea there would be a charge beyond his council and water rates, and applied for judicial review.

Judgment
Lightman J, treating the case as a private law question of whether the Council was entitled to payment, held that there was enrichment through an incontrovertible benefit, but was no right because there was no unjust factor. It was common ground that a benefit was received and there was no defence of change of position. There is enrichment if services are either freely accepted or there is an incontrovertible benefit. Although the Council argued that Mr Rowe freely accepted the services, there was no acquiescence in their supply for a consideration.  The council could not suggest an unjust factor, e.g. mistake on the part of the council. He cited G&J para 1-019 to say that if a reasonable person ought to have known that someone would have expected payment, but did not take a reasonable opportunity to reject them, then he will be considered enriched. And normally a ratepayer will think he must pay for services, but this case was different.

See also

English unjust enrichment law

Notes

References

English unjust enrichment case law
High Court of Justice cases
2003 in case law
2003 in British law